Graydon is a name. Notable people with the name include:

Given name

 Graydon Eggers (1903–1994), American football coach
 Graydon Henning, Australian maritime historian
 Graydon Hoare, software developer who designed the programming language Rust
 Graydon Nesfield (born 1944), Barbadian cricketer
 Graydon Nicholas (born 1946), former Lieutenant Governor of New Brunswick
 Graydon Oliver (born 1978), retired American professional tennis player
 Graydon Parrish (born 1970), American figurative painter
 Graydon Smith, Canadian politician
 Graydon Staniforth (born 1973), Australian rugby union player

Middle name
 Benjamin Graydon Allmark (1911–2004), Canadian politician
 Edward Graydon Carter (born 1949), Canadian-born American journalist and author
 Julia Graydon Sharpe (1857–1939), American female portrait artist
 Michael John Graydon Soroka (born 1997), Canadian baseball pitcher
 Louis Graydon Sullivan (1951–1991), American author and activist

Surname

 Alexander Gradon or Graydon (1666–1739), Irish politician
 Alexander Graydon (1752–1818), American author and officer
 Cliff Graydon (born 1946 or 1947), Canadian politician
 Gordon Graydon (1896–1953), Canadian politician
 Gordon Graydon (Alberta politician) (born 1942), Canadian politician
 Jay Graydon (born 1949), American record producer
 Joe Graydon (1919–2001), American musician
 John Graydon (disambiguation), multiple people
 Katharine Merrill Graydon (1858–1934), American classical scholar
 Keith Graydon (born 1983), Irish football player
 Michael Graydon (born 1938), Royal Air Force air marshal
 Ray Graydon (born 1947), English football manager
 Richard Graydon (1922–2014), British stunt performer
 Robert Graydon (disambiguation), multiple people
 Thomas Graydon (1881–1949), All-American football player
 William Graydon (disambiguation), multiple people

Fictional characters
 Graydon, a character from the 2000 film What Planet Are You From?
 Graydon Creed, a Marvel Comics supervillain

See also
 Graydon (disambiguation)